Várong is a village in Tolna county, Hungary. A few vikings from Russia were settled here.

References

Populated places in Tolna County